The NRA Bianchi Cup is the National Action Pistol Championship, an event in Action Shooting.  In 2014, there was $500,000 worth of cash and prizes up for grabs.

Match History 

The Bianchi Cup was created in 1979 by John Bianchi, Bianchi International, and awarded to the winner of the Bianchi Cup International Pistol Tournament. NRA designated the Bianchi Cup as the National Action Pistol Championship in 1984 and assumed operational control of the tournament the next year. Bianchi International presented the Bianchi Cup to the NRA in 1985. The Cup is awarded annually to the National Action Pistol Champion.

Match Conditions

1979: An aggregate of 192 shots fired in four 48 shot matches: The Practical Event, The Barricade Event, The Falling Plate Event and the Moving Target Event (modified). Possible score of 1920-192X.

1985: An aggregate of 204 shots consisting of three 48 shot matches (The Barricade Event, The Falling Plate Event, The Moving Target Event (mod.) plus a 60 shot International Rapid Fire Event. Possible score 2040-204X.

1986: Returned to the conditions of 1979.

Key

NRA Action Pistol Bianchi Cup Champions

NRA Action Pistol Metallic Division Champions
The Metallic Division was instituted with the 1998 Bianchi Cup.

NRA Action Pistol Women's Division Champions
The Women's Division was instituted with the 1980 Bianchi Cup.

References

Handgun shooting sports
Bianchi Cup Champions
Shooting sports in the United States
Bianchi